Brandon Barnes (born 1972) is an American musician and producer.

Brandon Barnes may also refer to:

 Brandon Barnes (baseball) (born 1986), American baseball outfielder
 Brandon Barnes (offensive lineman) (born 1985), American football offensive tackle
 Brandon Barnes (linebacker) (born 1981), former American football linebacker
 Brandon Barnes, frequent songwriting partner of American singer Brian McKnight
 Brandon Barnes (soccer) (born 1994), American soccer player